Nocturne of Love (Spanish: Nocturno de amor) is a 1948 Mexican drama film directed by Emilio Gómez Muriel and starring Miroslava, Víctor Junco and Hilda Sour, with the special participation of Yolanda Montes. It was co-written by Luis and Janet Alcoriza.

Cast
 Miroslava as Marta Reyes 
 Víctor Junco   
 Hilda Sour  
 Carlos Martínez Baena  
 Miguel Ángel Ferriz
 Alfredo Varela
 Juan Orraca 
 Francisco Reiguera 
 Roberto Y. Palacios   
 Lupe del Castillo  
 Lilia Prado    
 Juan Bruno Tarraza  
 Yolanda Montes

References

Bibliography
Aviña, Rafael. David Silva: Un campeón de mil rostros. UNAM, 2007.
González Casanova, Manuel. Luis Alcoriza: Soy un solitario que escribe. Diputación de Badajoz, Departamento de Publicaciones, 2006.

External links
 

1948 films
1940s Spanish-language films

Mexican black-and-white films
Mexican drama films
1948 drama films
1940s Mexican films